The London Borough of Brent is a London borough in north-west London. It borders the boroughs of Harrow to the north-west, Barnet to the north-east, Camden to the east, the City of Westminster to the south-east, as well as the Royal Borough of Kensington and Chelsea, Hammersmith and Fulham and Ealing to the south. Most of the eastern border is formed by the Roman road Watling Street, which is now the modern A5.

Brent's population is estimated to be 329,771. Major districts are Kilburn, Willesden, Wembley and Harlesden, with sub-districts Stonebridge, Kingsbury, Kensal Green and Queen's Park. Brent has a mixture of residential, industrial and commercial land. It includes many districts of inner-city character in the east and a more distinct suburban character in the west, part of which formed part of the early 20th century Metroland developments. Today Brent is known for being home to Wembley Stadium, the country's largest stadium by capacity, as well as other landmarks such as the Kiln Theatre, the Swaminarayan Temple and Wembley Arena. Other notable places are the Welsh Harp reservoir and the Park Royal commercial estate. The local authority is Brent London Borough Council.

Local government

Administrative history

Brent was formed in 1965 from the area of the former Municipal Borough of Wembley and Municipal Borough of Willesden of Middlesex. The Municipal Borough of Wembley was formed by a merger of the parishes of Wembley (originally part of the Ancient Parish of Harrow-on-the-Hill) and Kingsbury in 1934.

Its name derives from the River Brent which runs through the borough and separated the former boroughs of Wembley and Willesden.

Representation

Brent is divided into 21 electoral wards. Some wards share a name with the traditional areas above, others include Mapesbury and Welsh Harp.

The borough includes three parliamentary constituencies: Brent North, Brent Central and Hampstead and Kilburn, which includes part of the London Borough of Camden. Before the 2010 United Kingdom general election it was divided into three constituencies contained wholly within the borough – Brent South, Brent East and Brent North.

Politics

Brent London Borough Council is elected every four years, with currently 63 councillors being elected at each election. While the Labour Party has been the largest single party on the council for about half its history and the Conservatives and the Liberal Democrats have each been the largest party at other times, there have been several periods when no party has had overall control. Labour regained control in 2010 and increased their majority at the 2014 election and 2018 election. As of 2020, the council is composed of the following councillors:

The Leader of the council is Labour Councillor Muhammed Butt.

Proposals to partition the borough
The merger of Willesden and Wembley (including Kingsbury) in 1965 created the borough of Brent, but this was one of the more unpopular of the mergers occurring during the creation of the modern London boroughs. Reasons for this included the limited road links between the two areas (with the A4088 and A404 Harrow Road the only major road links across the Brent valley boundary), the lack of a focal point or ‘heart’ for the borough and the contrasting characteristics; with Willesden more inner-city in nature, and Wembley more suburban. Widening schemes for the North Circular Road, which passed along the Brent valley, close to the boundary between the two, increased this sense of separation.

The unpopularity persisted and in 1989 more than ten thousand people signed a petition calling for Wembley (with Kingsbury) to regain its independence or else join with the London Borough of Harrow with which it had historic administrative links, had better transport integration and had shared common suburban interests. The 1994, the Boundary Commission considered this, and other requests, considering a wide range of options including restoring independence to the districts, or joining them to different neighbouring boroughs – an option the Commission preferred.

Wembley and Harrow would represent a pre-20th century remerger. The London Borough of Harrow supported the failed idea and that of the eastern boundary's  straightening (with the London Borough of Barnet along the A5 Road (Watling Street, Edgware Road)). Willesden was harder to idealise a match with an existing borough. The Boroughs and Commission, by narrow consensus, saw Ealing as most likely, yet a main bar would remain of the lack of a focal point and the industrial zones of Park Royal, Old Oak Common and North Acton, a busy buffer zone.

The Commission concluded there was insufficient justification for the disruption of the proposals, which should only be considered during a comprehensive review of London's boundaries.

Demographics

In 1801, the civil parishes that form the modern borough had a total population of 2,022. This rose slowly throughout the nineteenth century, as the district became built up; reaching 5,646 in the middle of the century. When the railways arrived the rate of population growth increased. The population took five decades to rebound to the more muted peak of the 1950s, when much industry relocated from London, further boosting the speed of the wave of new housing then built.

Brent is the most diverse locality in the UK by country of birth. It in 2019 became the only local authority with over 50% of residents, namely 52%, born abroad. Large Asian and Indian, Black African, Black Caribbean, Irish, and Eastern European communities exist. 45 percent of the population was a minority ethnicity in the 1991 census, the most in England at the time. In 1991 17.2% were Indian, 10.2% were Black Caribbean and 9% were Irish. Brent was the only Outer London borough combining high proportions of Indian and Afro-Caribbean ethnicities.

The 2001 UK Census found that the borough had a population of 263,464 residents, of whom 127,806 were male, and 135,658 female. Of those stating a choice, 47.71% described themselves as Christian, 17.71% as Hindu, 12.26% as Muslim and 10% as having no religion. Among residents, 39.96% were in full-time employment and 7.86% in part-time employment – compared to a London average of 42.64% and 8.62%, respectively. Narrowly most residents included an owner-occupier in their household, with 23.17% of households owning their house outright, and a further 31.33% owning with a mortgage. 10.59% were in local authority housing, with a further 13.29% renting from a housing association, or other registered social landlord.

The 2021 census found that the borough has England and Wales's lowest proportion of people born in the UK, at 43.9%.

The borough of Brent is extremely ethnically diverse, having changed greatly since 1951. In the 2011 census, those who identified as White British made up 18% of the borough's population. 18% identified as other White, 5% were of mixed heritage, those of South Asian heritage comprised about 33%, those of African and Caribbean heritage about 19%, and other ethnic groups about 7%. White ethnicities were relatively high in the wards of Mapesbury (straddling Willesden Green and Cricklewood), Brondesbury Park, Queen's Park and Kilburn. Black ethnicities in highest proportion were in Stonebridge, Harlesden and Kensal Green wards. Asian ethnicities in highest proportion were in the wards of Alperton, Wembley Central and Kenton. Those who ethnically identify as BAME (Black, Asian and minority Ethnic) was as high as 86% in Wembley Central – one of the highest in London – and most other Brent wards have a majority BAME population. Queen's Park had the lowest BAME proportion, at 37.0%.

Brent has the highest proportion of Irish residents in Britain, with 4% of the population. It also has the largest Brazilian community in the UK; one of the largest Indian communities; a significant Afro-Caribbean community; and more recent Romanian, Polish and Somali communities.

Religion

As of 2011, 41.5% identified themselves as Christian, 18.6% Muslim, 17.8% Hindu and 10.6% with no religion. Brent is notably home of the Neasden Temple, once the largest Hindu Mandir outside India; and JFS, the largest Jewish school in Europe. There is also an Islamic school called Islamia Primary School founded by Cat Stevens.

The following table shows the religious identity of residents residing in Brent according to the 2001, 2011 and the 2021 censuses.

Health 
Per the House of Commons survey of female genital mutilation, in the year to 31 March 2016, Brent represented the highest number of attendees, by current residence or visiting location, to medical services, at 1250, 545 more than the next-highest local authority, Bristol.

In 2015, the BBC reported it was some wards of Brent and four other London boroughs that had the highest UK rates of tuberculosis (over 150 per ) per a high, but falling, situation from 2011 to 2013.

Ethnicity 

This table shows the stated ethnic group of respondents in estimations for 1966 based off of the 1966 sample census and the 1991 to 2021 censuses in Brent.

Geography

Major districts of Brent include Kilburn, Willesden and Wembley.

Climate
Climate in this area has mild differences between highs and lows, and there is adequate rainfall year-round.  The Köppen Climate Classification subtype for this climate is "Cfb". (Marine West Coast Climate/Oceanic climate).

Economy
Diageo has its head office in Park Royal and in the London Borough of Brent, on a former Guinness brewery property. The brewery was closed in 2004; it had produced beer since 1936. Diageo planned to move its head office to Brent from Central London when the lease on the Central London office expired in 2010.

Brent is the joint fourth-worst Borough in London for levels of child poverty. Save the Children reported in 2011 that 11,000 children are impoverished.

Amenities and culture

Education

Compulsory recycling
Recycling has been compulsory in the borough of Brent since 2008. Through a green box collection scheme the borough aims to improve on the 25 per cent recycled waste it already achieves.

London Fire Brigade
The London Borough of Brent has three fire stations: Park Royal, Wembley and Willesden. Brent has a mixture of residential, industrial and commercial land. Wembley National Stadium is in the borough; on match days the fire safety of over 90,000 people falls to the London Fire Brigade. The Wembley station covers the largest area in the borough, . Two pumping appliances, a fire rescue unit and an aerial ladder platform are based there. Willesden, for its more typical area covered, responded to over a thousand incidents in 2006/2007. Two pumping appliances reside there.
Within the borough, 4,105 incidents occurred in 2006/2007.

Transport
Like most of northwest London, Brent is served extensively by the London Underground. A total of 21 tube stations are located in Brent, all served by either the Metropolitan, Jubilee, Bakerloo or Piccadilly Lines. All of them are surface level, with the exception of Kilburn Park tube station in the southeast of the borough. This total is actually the second highest out of all London boroughs, being second only to Westminster, which has 32 stations within its boundaries. The numerous London Underground, London Overground and National Rail stations in the borough are:

Alperton tube station
Brondesbury railway station
Brondesbury Park railway station
Dollis Hill tube station
Harlesden station
Kensal Green station
Kenton station
Kilburn tube station
Kilburn Park tube station
Kingsbury tube station
Neasden tube station
North Wembley station
Northwick Park tube station
Preston Road tube station
Queensbury tube station
Queen's Park station
South Kenton station
Stonebridge Park station
Sudbury Town tube station
Sudbury & Harrow Road railway station
Wembley Central station
Wembley Park tube station
Wembley Stadium railway station 
Willesden Green tube station
Willesden Junction station

Travel to work 
In March 2011, the main forms of transport that residents used to travel to work were (of all residents aged 16–74): 
 underground, metro, light rail, tram, 18.3%; 
 driving a car or van, 11.5%; 
 bus, minibus or coach, 11.5%; 
 on foot, 4.6%; 
 train, 4.5%; 
 work mainly at or from home, 2.6%; 
 bicycle, 1.7%.

Landmarks
Wembley Stadium
Wembley Arena
Neasden Temple
Jubilee clock Harlesden 
Brent Civic Centre
Shree Swaminarayan Temple, Kingsbury

Parks and open spaces

Roe Green Park
Fryent Country Park
Queen's Park
Roundwood Park
Tiverton Green
Gladstone Park
Barham Park
One Tree Hill Park
Maybank Open Space
King Edward VII Park
Harlesden Town Garden

Sport and leisure
The Borough has three Non-League football clubs:
Tokyngton Manor F.C., which plays at Spratleys Meadow.
Wembley F.C., which plays at Vale Farm stadium
South Kilburn F.C. which plays at Vale Farm stadium.

Town twinning

Brent is twinned with:
 South Dublin, Leinster, Ireland

Freedom of the Borough
The following people and military units have received the Freedom of the Borough of Brent.

Individuals
 Nelson Mandela : 24 June 2013.

Military Units

References

External links

 
Brent
1965 establishments in the United Kingdom